Overcome by Happiness is the debut studio album by American indie rock band Pernice Brothers, released on May 19, 1998 by Sub Pop.

Track listing

References

Pernice Brothers albums
1998 debut albums
Sub Pop albums